The James A. Corbin House, at 345 Main St. in Spearfish, South Dakota, was built in 1918.  It was listed on the National Register of Historic Places in 1990.

It is a two-story vernacular-style house.  Nonetheless, it was deemed significant as "a good example of vernacular domestic housing in Spearfish, South Dakota, in the early 20th Century. Using a mixture of stylistic components, it is one of the few brick or brick-faced houses in the city."

References

Houses on the National Register of Historic Places in South Dakota
Late 19th and Early 20th Century American Movements architecture
Houses completed in 1918
Lawrence County, South Dakota